Not The Captain's Birthday Party? is an album released in July 1986 by The Damned. The album is based on a live performance recorded by Engineer Tony Taverner, using La Maison Rouge mobile, on 27 November 1977 at the Roundhouse.

Essentially, the album is a swift re-issue of The Captain's Birthday Party release with the addition of "I'm Bored" on the LP and "I Fall" on the CD.

Track listing 
All songs written by Brian James, except where noted.
 
Side One 
"You Take my Money" – 2:20
"Creep (you can't Fool me)" – 2:10
"Fan Club" – 2:46
"Problem Child" – 2:14 ~ (Scabies, James) 
"I'm Bored" – ?:?? ~ (Vanian, Burns, Rat Scabies) 
 
Side Two 
"So Messed Up" – 1:57
"New Rose" – 2:17
"I Feel Alright" – 4:32 ~ (Dave Alexander, Ron Asheton, Scott Asheton, Iggy Pop)
"Born to Kill" – 2:46 
 
 
(CD)
"You Take my Money" – 2:20
"Creep (you can't Fool me)" – 2:10
"Fan Club" – 2:46
"Problem Child" – 2:14 ~ (Scabies, James) 
"I Fall" – ?:??
"So Messed Up" – 1:57
"New Rose" – 2:17
"I Feel Alright" – 4:32 ~ (Dave Alexander, Ron Asheton, Scott Asheton, Iggy Pop)
"Born to Kill" – 2:46

Personnel 
 Bass – Captain Sensible
 Design – Pete Maclin
 Drums – Rat Scabies
 Engineer – Tony Taverner
 Guitar – Brian James
 Photography – Keith Morris
 Vocals – Dave Vanian

References 

The Damned (band) live albums
1986 live albums